Weightlifting, for the 2013 Bolivarian Games, took place from 17 November to 20 November 2013. Colombia took 27 gold medals to win the event.

Medal table
Key:

Medal summary
PR – Pan American record

Men

Women

New records
The following records were established and improved upon during the competition.

References

Events at the 2013 Bolivarian Games
2013 in weightlifting
2013 Bolivarian Games